Moondru Deivangal is a 1971 Indian Tamil-language drama film, directed by Dada Mirasi and written by Chitralaya Gopu. The film stars Sivaji Ganesan, Muthuraman and Nagesh. It is a remake of the 1968 Marathi film Aamhi Jato Amuchya Gava. The film was released on 14 August 1971.

Plot 

Three thieves get into a family and act as if they are good people. However, the family's humility causes a change of the thieves' heart and do they reform form the rest of the story.

Cast 
Sivaji Ganesan as Siva
Muthuraman as Muthu
Nagesh as Nagu
V. K. Ramasamy as Kumar's uncle
S. V. Subbaiah as Pasupathy
Sivakumar as Kumar
V. S. Raghavan as a retired police officer
M. R. R. Vasu as Veerappan
Vennira Aadai Moorthy as Moorthy
Senthamarai as a police officer
Chandrakala as Lakshmi
Rukmani as Parvathi
Jaya Kausalya
Vijaya Chandrika as Muthu's wife
K. R. Indira Devi
Sivakami

Production 
Moondru Deivangal is based on the 1968 Marathi film Aamhi Jato Amuchya Gava, written by Madhusudan Kalekar. The screenplay was written by Chitralaya Gopu, departing from most of his earlier screenplays which were comedies.

Soundtrack 
The music was composed by M. S. Viswanathan, with lyrics by Kannadasan. The song "Vasanthathil Or Naal" is set in Darbari Kanada raga.

Release 
Moondru Deivangal was released on 14 August 1971, and underperformed commercially; Gopu felt this was because "it wasn't of Sivaji's standard".

References

External links 
 

1970s Tamil-language films
1971 drama films
1971 films
Films scored by M. S. Viswanathan
Indian drama films
Tamil remakes of Marathi films